Télémagino is a Canadian French-language specialty channel owned by WildBrain. Launched on 5 July 2010, as a sister to an equivalent English-language service, it airs children programming for ages 2–11. Not only is it a French version of Family Jr., but it also doubles as a French version of  Family Channel. The channel previously operated under Disney–ABC Television Group's preschool television brands, including Playhouse Disney and Disney Junior, but was rebranded on 18 September 2015, following the acquisition of Canadian rights to Disney's children's brands and programming by Corus Entertainment.

Along with its English-language parent channel Family Channel and Family Jr., it is available in over four million Canadian households as of 2013.

History

As Playhouse Disney Télé and Disney Junior
The channel was licensed in 2006 as Vrak Junior, a sister channel to Astral's Vrak TV, though, aimed at younger viewers than Vrak. It was launched on 5 July 2010, as Playhouse Disney Télé. Three years prior, an English language version (then known as Playhouse Disney) was launched on 30 November 2007, as a multiplex channel of Family. The network took on the new Disney Junior brand in 2011.

On 4 March 2013, following the Competition Bureau's approval of Bell Media's takeover of Astral, it was announced that Family Channel and its sister networks (including the Disney Junior services, Disney XD, and MusiquePlus) would be divested in an attempt to relieve CRTC concerns regarding the takeover. On 28 November 2013, DHX Media announced it would acquire the four channels for $170 million pending CRTC approval. On 24 July 2014, the CRTC approved DHX's purchase of the networks, and the deal was closed on 31 July 2014.

As Télémagino
On 16 April 2015, it was announced that Corus Entertainment had acquired Canadian rights to Disney Channel's program library and would launch a Canadian version of Disney Channel that September, and that its sibling brands of Disney Junior and XD would be re-launched at a later date. In anticipation for this transition, DHX concurrently announced that its Disney-branded networks would be re-branded as spin-offs of Family Channel. The re-branding of Disney Junior's French feed was tentatively announced as Famille Junior, but was later changed to Télémagino. The new name was officially introduced on 18 September 2015, alongside the re-branding of its English-language counterpart as Family Jr.

Programming

Current programming

 The Adventures of Puss in Boots (Les Aventures du Chat Potté) (12 June 2017 – present)
 All Hail King Julien (Roi Julian! L'élu des lemurs) (17 April 2017 – present)
 Bananas in Pyjamas
 Bob the Builder (Bob le bricoleur) (4 September 2017 – present)
 Caillou (5 February 2018 – present)
 Care Bears: Unlock the Magic (Les Câlinours : Libérez la Magie) (November 2019 – present) 
 Daniel Tiger's Neighborhood (Le village de Dany) (6 November 2017 – present)
 Dinotrux (11 September 2017 – present)
 Dragons: Race to the Edge (Dragons: Par-delà les rives) (10 July 2017 – present)
 Franny's Feet (Franny et les chaussures magiques)
 Home: Adventures with Tip & Oh (En route: Les aventures de Tif et Oh) (30 July 2018 – present)
 In the Night Garden... (Dans le jardin des rêves...)
 Inspector Gadget (Inspecteur Gadget) (5 February 2018 – present) (Also on Télétoon)
 Johnny Test (26 February 2018 – present)
 Justin Time (Justin Rêve) (2011 – present)
 Kate & Mim-Mim (Kate et Mim-Mim) (9 January 2017 – present)
 Kody Kapow (19 May 2018 – present)
 Little People (4 September 2017 – present)
 Messy Goes to Okido (Messy et le monde d'Okido)
 The Mighty Jungle (La jungle magique) (6 January 2016 – present)
 The Mr. Peabody & Sherman Show (Le show de M. Peabody et Sherman) (3 November 2018 – present)
 Nature Cat (Félibert, le chaventurier) (1 July 2016 – present)
 Playdate (Viens jouer!)
 Pet Pals (Copains de compagnie) (September 2015 – present)
 Poko (9 January 2016 – present)
 Rainbow Ruby (9 April 2018 – present)
 The Save-Ums! (Les Sauve-tout) (2015–present)
 Space Ranger Roger (Roger, le heros sideral) (January 2017 – present)
 Strawberry Shortcake's Berry Bitty Adventures (Charlotte aux Fraises: Aventures à Fraisi-Paradis) (Early 2012–present)
 Strawberry Shortcake: Berry in the Big City (Charlotte aux Fraises: Berry dans la grande ville) (2022-present)
 Teletubbies
 Topsy and Tim (Topsy et Tim)
 Trollhunters: Tales of Arcadia (Chasseurs de Trolls: Les Contes d'Arcadia) (7 July 2018 – present)
 Turbo FAST (3 March 2018 – present)
 Twirlywoos
 Waybuloo
 Yo Gabba Gabba!
 Yup Yups
 Zoboomafoo

Acquired programming

 Lucas the Spider (Lucas l'araignée) (TBA 2023)
 Oddbods (TBA 2023)

Former programming

 101 Dalmatians: The Series (Les 101 dalmatiens)
 Aladdin
 Bear in the Big Blue House (Tibère et la Maison bleue) (5 July 2010 – 31 December 2015)
 Bo on the Go! (1 2 3 Bo !) (September 2015 - 25 June 2018)
 Doc McStuffins (Docteur la peluche) (8 April 2012 – 31 August 2015)
 The Doodlebops (Les Doodlebops) (5 July 2010 – 31 August 2016)
 DuckTales (La Bande à Picsou)
 Elliot Moose (Elliot) (6 May 2011 - 2013)
 Handy Manny (Manny et ses outils)
 Harry and His Bucket Full of Dinosaurs (Harry et ses dinosaures)
 Higglytown Heroes (Les Héros d'Higglyville) (5 July 2010 – September 2013)
 Jake and the Never Land Pirates (Jake et les Pirates du Pays Imaginaire) (6 May 2011 – 29 November 2015)
 Johnny and the Sprites (Johnny et Les Sprites)
 Jungle Junction (En route pour la jungle)
 Little Einsteins (Les Petits Einstein)
 Maggie and the Ferocious Beast (Marguerite et la bête féroce) (5 July 2010 – 31 December 2012)
 Mickey Mouse Clubhouse (La Maison de Mickey)
 Naughty Naughty Pets (Mes bestioles chéries) (1 July 2016 – 3 September 2017)
 PB&J Otter (5 July 2010 – June 2013)
 Sofia the First (Princesse Sofia) (2013 – 2015)
 Stanley (6 May 2011 - 2013)
 Stella and Sam (Stella et Sacha) (2010 – 30 September 2016)
 The Secret World of Benjamin Bear (L'ours Benjamin)
 Julius Jr. (Julius Jr) (3 October 2015 - 28 February 2018)
 Thomas & Friends (Thomas et ses amis) (2015 - 26 August 2018)
 Tickety Toc (2013 - 24 June 2018)

See also
 Family Channel
 Family Jr.

International distribution
 Saint Pierre and Miquelon (French overseas collectivity) - distributed on the SPM Telecom system.

References

External links
  

WildBrain
Digital cable television networks in Canada
French-language television networks in Canada
Television channels and stations established in 2010
2010 establishments in Canada
Children's television networks in Canada
Commercial-free television networks